Buitenhof may refer to:

 Buitenhof (TV series), a Dutch Sunday morning political interview television programme
 Buitenhof (The Hague), a square in The Hague, Netherlands
Pathé Buitenhof, a movie theater in the Netherlands